Patrick Pendanx (born 16 May 1975) is a footballer currently playing for Championnat de France amateur 2 side Stade Montois as a midfielder. In the 1996–97 season, Pendanx played seven Ligue 2 games for Chamois Niortais.

See also
Football in France
List of football clubs in France

References

External links
Patrick Pendanx profile at chamoisfc79.fr

1975 births
Living people
French footballers
Association football midfielders
Chamois Niortais F.C. players
Ligue 2 players
Stade Montois (football) players
People from Dax, Landes
Sportspeople from Landes (department)
Footballers from Nouvelle-Aquitaine